The 2010 Acre referendum consisted of a decision regarding maintaining the time zone change for the Brazilian state of Acre, as the state had an 1-hour difference from Brasília Time (UTC-03:00) in 2008, when the original time zone had minus 2 hours from Brasília.

History
In 1913, Executive Order 2,784 was signed, which instituted the first time zones in Brazil. According to paragraph d, in joint interpretation with paragraph c, Acre and the area west of the line which connects the municipalities of Tabatinga and Porto Acre, was incorporated as part of the "fourth zone", characterized by GMT-5 (current UTC-05:00). Almost a century after the change, Federal Law no. 11,662 of 2008 was signed, which, along with another change in the state of Pará (inserting it totally in the Brasília Regional Time), made the state of Acre and southwest Amazonas advance the time by one hour, to the UTC-04:00 time zone, on 23 June 2008.

Reasons for change
The time zone change was proposed by then Senator Tião Viana (PT-AC), who defended the change by stating that the time difference between Acre and nearby states jeopardized the state economic and culturally. After the referendum, the Abert (Brazilian Association of Radio and Television Broadcasters) opposed the return to the previous time, owing to scheduling adjustments that would be required after the institution of the Brazilian advisory rating system by the Ministry of Justice in 2007.

The referendum and its effects
The referendum was held on 31 October 2010, on the same day of the second round of the 2010 presidential election. The majority of the population decided to choose to return to the previous time zone, which had a 2-hour difference from Brasília Regional Time.

The provisions of the referendum did not immediately commence due to doubts of the validity of the referendum by certain political elements, opposite pressure from TV broadcasters, in a way that, almost 3 years after the referendum, it was yet to be put in effect, and only finally approved by the Federal Senate committees in September 2013.

As consequence, the Federal Law no. 12,876/2013 reestablished the previous time in Acre and southwest Amazonas, repealing the Federal Law no. 11,662/2008. The regions covered by the change returned to the old time zone at midnight on Sunday, 10 November 2013.

Result
As officially published by Electoral Justice, the result of Acre referendum was the following:

References

Referendums in Brazil
2010 referendums
2010 in Brazil
2010 elections in Brazil
October 2010 events in South America